The 1997 Cork Senior Hurling Championship was the 109th staging of the Cork Senior Hurling Championship since its establishment by the Cork County Board in 1887. The draw for the opening fixtures took place on 8 December 1996. The championship ended on 5 October 1997.

Avondhu entered the championship as the defending champions, however, they were defeated by Sarsfields at the quarter-final stage.

On 5 October 1997, Imokilly won the championship following a 1-18 to 2-12 defeat of Sarsfields in the final. This was their first championship title.

Sarsfields' Pat Ryan was the championship's top scorer with 1-47.

Team changes

To Championship

Promoted from the Cork Intermediate Hurling Championship
 Newtownshandrum

From Championship

Regraded to the Cork Intermediate Hurling Championship
 Milford
 Youghal

Results

First round

Second round

Quarter-finals

Semi-finals

Final

Championship statistics

Top scorers

Overall

In a single game

Miscellaneous

 Imokilly win their first title.
 Sarsfeilds qualify for the final for the first time since 1989.

References

Cork Senior Hurling Championship
Cork Senior Hurling Championship